"Be OK" is the first single from Ingrid Michaelson's third studio album, Be OK.

The song was used in the films The House Bunny and The Decoy Bride, in Season 1, episode 7 of 90210, in Season 2, episode 15 of Parenthood, in Season 4, episode 1 of Ugly Betty, and in advertisements for Better With You.

It was also used in commercials for Mott's Apple Juice, Ritz Crackers, Travelers Insurance and German insurance company Allianz.

In 2017, Michaelson performed another version of song on the TBS news satire show Full Frontal with Samantha Bee, titled  "(Earth Is) Not OK" with similarly altered lyrics describing effects of climate change and hurricanes sung from the perspective of the earth.

Music video
Two versions of the music video debuted through the Stand Up to Cancer Foundation. One version debuted through BORDERS, while the other debuted on the Stand Up to Cancer website and featured the acoustic version.

Charts

References

2008 singles
Songs written by Ingrid Michaelson
Ingrid Michaelson songs
2008 songs